Athlone Town Association Football Club Ladies is an Irish association football club based in Athlone. In February 2020 the Football Association of Ireland (FAI) announced the formation of the club as an expansion team for the upcoming 2020 Women's National League season. It is the women's section of Athlone Town. The senior team plays in the Women's National League while a junior team competes at Women's Under 17 National League level.

History 
In July 2018 Athlone Town were among 11 founding clubs in a new Under-17 Women's National League. In November 2019, the club's application to join the senior Women's National League for the following 2020 season was accepted. The first match was originally scheduled for March 2020, however, the team was made to wait until 15 August 2020 due to the COVID-19 pandemic in the Republic of Ireland which delayed the start of the season. The first game ended in an encouraging 1–0 defeat by Wexford Youths. On 5 September 2020 the club secured their first goals and first win, beating fellow newcomers Treaty United 3–2 with goals from Katelyn Keogh, Paula Doran and Kellie Brennan. They finished the shortened season joint-sixth of nine teams with a  record.

A separate independent women's football club named Bealnamulla LFC come from the Athlone area. They reached the national FAI Women's Cup final in 2000, but were beaten 7–0 by Shamrock Rovers, the dominant team of the era. Five members of Athlone Town's inaugural squad were former Bealnamulla  players.

Players

Current squad

References

External links

Ladies
Association football clubs established in 2020
Sport in Athlone
Association football clubs in Leinster
2020 establishments in Ireland
Women's association football clubs in the Republic of Ireland
Women's National League (Ireland) teams